Futuro Beach is a 2014 drama film co-written and directed by Karim Aïnouz, and starring Wagner Moura, Clemens Schick and Jesuíta Barbosa. Shot in Fortaleza and Berlin, the film had its world premiere in the competition section of the 64th Berlin International Film Festival.

Plot
When Donato, a lifeguard at Praia do Futuro, fails to rescue a drowning German tourist, he feels the tourist's death was his fault and begins a journey to escape from his present self. Donato leaves for Berlin in search of his German lover, Konrad, whom he had met ten years earlier at Praia do Futuro and saved from drowning. Whenever he drifts away, his younger brother, Ayrton, brings him back.

Cast
 Wagner Moura as Donato
 Clemens Schick as Konrad
 Jesuíta Barbosa as Ayrton
 Sabine Timoteo as Heiko's wife
 Ingo Naujoks as Mechanic
 Emily Cox as Nanna
 Natascha Paulick as bartender
 Christoph Zrenner as school janitor
 Sophie Charlotte Conrad as Dakota
 Yannik Burwiek as Heiko's son

References

External links
 
 
 

2014 films
2014 drama films
2014 LGBT-related films
2014 multilingual films
2010s German films
2010s German-language films
2010s Portuguese-language films
Best Picture APCA Award winners
Brazilian drama films
Brazilian LGBT-related films
Brazilian multilingual films
Films set in Berlin
Films set in Fortaleza
Films shot in Berlin
Films shot in Fortaleza
Films directed by Karim Aïnouz
Gay-related films
German drama films
German LGBT-related films
German multilingual films
LGBT-related drama films